Zhenjiang South railway station is a high-speed railway station in Zhenjiang, Jiangsu, People's Republic of China. It is on the Beijing–Shanghai high-speed railway.

See also
Zhenjiang also has Zhenjiang railway station, on the Beijing–Shanghai railway and Shanghai–Nanjing intercity railway lines.

Railway stations in Jiangsu
Railway stations in China opened in 2011
Railway stations in Zhenjiang